Halfway Island is the name of several places:

Halfway Island (Palmer Archipelago) an island in the Palmer Archipelago, Antarctica
Halfway Island, one of several islands in Canada
Halfway Island, an island off the east coast of Queensland, Australia
Halfway Island, a place (or maybe an island) in Alaska, United States
Halfway Island, an island in Hammond, NY United States

See also
 Halfway Islet - an island that is part of the Great Barrier Reef
 Midway Island